Krištůfek, Kristufek is a Czech surname. Notable people with the surname include:

 Frank Kristufek (1915–1998), American football player
 Petr Krištůfek (born 1971), Czech footballer
 Petra Krištúfková (born 1977), Slovak politician

Czech-language surnames